The Queensland Tertiary Admissions Centre (QTAC) is a non-profit organisation that provides undergraduate and postgraduate tertiary entry and application services for 17 major universities and tertiary education institutions in Queensland and northern New South Wales. QTAC is funded entirely by student application fees.

Starting for the 2020 cohort, QTAC is also responsible for calculating Queensland students' Australian Tertiary Admission Ranks for high-school graduates. This change accompanies a complete overhaul of the senior schooling system from the Queensland Curriculum and Assessment Authority, bringing Queensland in-line with the rest of Australia's high-school and university entry systems.

QTAC participating institutions
QTAC currently processes applications and issues offers on behalf of the following 17 institutions:

Universities
Australian Catholic University
Bond University
Central Queensland University
Federation University
Griffith University
James Cook University
Queensland University of Technology
Southern Cross University
The University of Queensland
Torrens University Australia
University of New England
University of Southern Queensland
University of the Sunshine Coast

TAFE
TAFE Queensland

Colleges
Christian Heritage College
Griffith College
SAE Creative Media Institute

References

External links 

Higher education in Australia
Australian tertiary education admission agencies
Companies based in Queensland
University and college admissions